King's Bench jurisdiction or King's Bench power is the extraordinary jurisdiction of an individual state's highest court over its inferior courts. In the United States, the states of Pennsylvania, Virginia, Florida, New Mexico, New York, Oklahoma and Wisconsin use the term to describe the extraordinary jurisdiction of their highest court, called the Court of Appeals in New York or the Supreme Court in the other states, over the courts below it. King's Bench jurisdiction includes the power to vacate the judgments of inferior courts when acting in extraordinary circumstances, for example, where the importance of an issue to public well-being or the expediency with which action must be taken in the interest of justice requires superseding normal judicial or appellate procedures. Federal courts in the United States possess the power to issue similar extraordinary writs under the All Writs Act. The term originates from the English Court of King’s Bench.

Pennsylvania
The Province of Pennsylvania, also known as the Pennsylvania Colony, was an English proprietary colony from the time of its royal charter in 1681 until the American Revolution in 1776 when Pennsylvania adopted its first Constitution. In Pennsylvania, King’s Bench power refers to an English common law authority which the General Assembly recognized and explicitly bestowed in 1722 on the Supreme Court of Pennsylvania, granting that court by charter constitutional authority over legal and supervisory aspects of the court system in the English colony.

As presently-codified, Pennsylvania statutes state that, "Notwithstanding any other provision of law, the Supreme Court may, on its own motion or upon petition of any party, in any matter pending before any court ... involving an issue of immediate public importance, assume plenary jurisdiction of such matter at any stage thereof and enter a final order or otherwise cause right and justice to be done."

The King’s Bench Powers also are described in Pennsylvania Statutes Title 42, § 502, in language taken from the 1722 Act:

The Pennsylvania Supreme Court held in In re Bruno, 101 A.3d 635, 677, 627 Pa. 505, 575 (2014), however, that its King’s Bench powers are constitutionally-inherent and are not dependent upon any statute:

Troubles and public feuds involved the supreme court in the early 1990s, specifically including Justice Rolf Larsen, who was criminally convicted and impeached by the house, then subsequently convicted and removed from office by the state senate. The public image of Larsen illustrated the need for court reform. The upheaval surrounding Justice Larsen's time on the bench served as a catalyst for a change in the state judicial discipline system. Pennsylvanians for Modern Courts credits the public turmoil he caused with leading to the overwhelming passage of a constitutional amendment that strengthened the way judges are disciplined for misconduct. In 1993, Pennsylvania voters amended the state constitution. The change created a new system for the oversight of judges through a state Judicial Conduct Board, which independently investigates misconduct complaints, and a Court of Judicial Discipline, which independently determines a Pennsylvania judge's innocence or guilt,. The supreme court, nevertheless, retains ultimate power over the Commonwealth`s judicial system and judges.

For an example of the exercise of King's Bench jurisdiction, see the Pennsylvania "kids for cash" scandal.  In 2020 the King's Bench jurisdiction was exercised three times; this was a rare instance of the jurisdiction being exercised multiple times in one year: 

In April 2020, the Pennsylvania Supreme Court exercised its King's Bench prerogative to take up Friends of Danny DeVito v. Wolf, regarding the Governor's executive order which forced businesses and a political campaign office to close due to the COVID-19 pandemic.

In June 2020, the Pennsylvania Supreme Court exercised its King's Bench prerogative to take up Scarnati v. Wolf, regarding the separation of powers between the Legislature and the Executive Branch to determine whether Title 35 of the PA code as written allows the legislature to force an end to Emergency Decrees made by the Governor.

In October 2020, the King's Bench power was invoked in ruling that ballots in an election cannot be discarded due to any subjective person deeming there to be a signature mismatch.

Further reading 
 William S. Stickman IV (2018). "The King's Bench Powers," in John J. Hare, ed., The Supreme Court of Pennsylvania: Life and Law in the Commonwealth, 1684-2017.

References

News Articles 

State court systems of the United States